David Valdes (born August 12, 1950, in Los Angeles) is an American film producer known for working in the western genre and collaborating with Clint Eastwood. His first production experience was as a guest on a film called Diary of a Mad Housewife, which was shot in his hometown in 1969.

Career 
Valdes first started out his career as an assistant director for films like Oh, God! Book II, The Outsiders and Tightrope, (which he also had a minor role in).

He became good friends with Eastwood after Tightrope and soon Valdes was promoted to associate producer/assistant director on 1985's Pale Rider. He went on as producer and production manager on other Eastwood films like The Dead Pool, Bird, Pink Cadillac, White Hunter Black Heart and Unforgiven.

Valdes received his first Oscar nomination for The Green Mile along with the film's director-producer-screenwriter Frank Darabont.

Valdes has since been producing more western films, as well as some science fiction films such as The Time Machine, Babylon A.D., and I Am Number Four.

Filmography 
 1985: Pale Rider
 1986: Ratboy
 1987: Gardens of Stone
 1987: Like Father Like Son
 1988: Bird
 1988: The Dead Pool
 1989: Pink Cadillac
 1990: White Hunter Black Heart
 1990: The Rookie
 1992: Unforgiven
 1993: In the Line of Fire
 1993: A Perfect World
 1995: The Stars Fell on Henrietta
 1997: Turbulence
 1999: The Green Mile
 2002: The Time Machine
 2003: Open Range
 2007: The Assassination of Jesse James by the Coward Robert Ford
 2008: Babylon A.D.
 2010: The Book of Eli
 2011: I Am Number Four
 2012: The Magic of Belle Isle
 2013: Beautiful Creatures
 2014: Transcendence
 2015: Point Break
 2019: Alita: Battle Angel
 2022: Avatar: The Way of Water
 2023: Dune: Part Two

References

External links 

1950 births
American film producers
American people of Portuguese descent
Film producers from California
Living people
People from Los Angeles